Jersey competed in the 2014 Commonwealth Games in Glasgow, Scotland from 23 July to 3 August 2014.

Athletics

Men

Women

Badminton

Mixed team

Pool F

Cycling

Mountain biking

Gymnastics 
Artistic

Women's

Shooting
Men
Pistol/Small bore

Full bore

Women
Pistol/Small bore

Swimming

Men

Triathlon

References

Nations at the 2014 Commonwealth Games
Jersey at the Commonwealth Games
2014 in Jersey